Alf Tomas Jonsson (born 12 April 1960) is a former ice hockey player from Sweden. He is assistant coach for the Danish national ice hockey team.

Jonsson was drafted by the New York Islanders in the 1979 NHL Entry Draft in the 2nd round, the 25th overall pick. During the 1980 World Junior Championships he and Reijo Ruotsalainen were the media's selections as the best defencemen of the tournament. Jonsson made his debut for the Islanders in the 1981–82 season, winning a Stanley Cup championship with the team in his first season. The Islanders repeated as Cup champions again the following season.

Jonsson played with the Islanders until 1989, when he was traded to the Edmonton Oilers. He played with the Oilers only for the remainder of the 1988–89 season. After that he moved back to Sweden, playing with Leksands IF until 1998.  He was named Swedish Player of the Year in 1994–95.

In 1994 Jonsson won an Olympic gold medal. That made him one of the first three members of the Triple Gold Club, players who have won a Stanley Cup, a World Championship and an Olympic gold medal. Jonsson was inducted into the IIHF Hall of Fame in 2000.

Career statistics

Regular season and playoffs

International

References

External links

Picture of Thomas Jonsson's Name on the 1982 Stanley Cup Plaque

1960 births
Swedish ice hockey defencemen
Modo Hockey players
New York Islanders draft picks
New York Islanders players
Edmonton Oilers players
Leksands IF players
Ice hockey players at the 1980 Winter Olympics
Ice hockey players at the 1994 Winter Olympics
Olympic ice hockey players of Sweden
Medalists at the 1980 Winter Olympics
Medalists at the 1994 Winter Olympics
Olympic medalists in ice hockey
Olympic gold medalists for Sweden
Olympic bronze medalists for Sweden
Stanley Cup champions
IIHF Hall of Fame inductees
Triple Gold Club
People from Falun
Living people
Sportspeople from Dalarna County
Swedish expatriate ice hockey players in the United States
Swedish expatriate ice hockey players in Canada
Swedish expatriate ice hockey people in Denmark